Say Something Good is the debut studio album by River City People, released by EMI in Europe and Capitol in the US in 1989. Following a reissue in 1990, it reached No. 23 in the UK and remained in the charts for nine weeks.

River City People signed a recording contract with EMI in 1988, after Channel 4's The Chart Show commissioned a video for the band's song "(What's Wrong With) Dreaming?". The band then recorded their debut album in Los Angeles during January–March 1989 with producer Don Gehman.

Six singles were released from the album, the first of which, "(What's Wrong With) Dreaming?", was released in July 1989 and peaked at No. 70 in the UK. The follow-up, "Say Something Good", failed to chart and the third, "Walking On Ice", reached No. 62. The double A-side, "Carry the Blame"/"California Dreamin'", was released in June 1990 and gave the band a No. 13 hit. A remixed version of "(What's Wrong With) Dreaming?" peaked at No. 40 and the final single, "When I Was Young", peaked at No. 62.

Reception

Upon release, Music & Media wrote: "The band seem to have their roots in the late 60s. The songs all have a distinct 60s feel for melodies and harmonies, which makes it a pleasant, if not lovable record." Billboard described the album as one which "merges London pop sensibilities with American rock vibes". They added: "Singer Siobhan Maher breathes dimension into sensitive and perceptive prose composed by bandmates/brothers Tim and Paul Speed." Mark Frith of Smash Hits wrote: "Virtually all the songs are excellent and the Rivers aren't afraid to use manic guitars on straight-forward pop songs. On top of all that, Siobhan Maher's vocals are positively the chirpiest in pop."

Anne Warren Murray of Dayton Daily News considered the album a "strong first effort" and added: "It's hard to say which side is better, since both are filled with alluring, melodic songs." She highlighted the "upbeat" tracks "(What's Wrong with) Dreaming?" and "Walking On Ice", and the "more mellow" "No Doubt" and "When I Was Young". Steven Miller of The Daily Utah Chronicle wrote: "The [album contains] ten cuts worth of quirky pop that owes a bit to All About Eve, vintage U2 and Laurie Anderson but stands out with an identity all its own."

Track listing

Personnel
River City People
 Siobhan Maher - vocals
 Tim Speed - guitars, vocals
 David Snell - bass
 Paul Speed - drums, percussion

Additional musicians
 Phil Shenale - keyboards, keyboard programming
 John Helliwell - saxophone on "Home and Dry"

Production
 Don Gehman - producer, engineer
 John Carter, Ed Thacker - engineer
 Dan Bosworth, Pete Magdeleno, Robin Laine - assistant engineers
 River City People - producers of "California Dreamin'" and "Huskisson St."
 Nick Davis - producer, engineer and mixer on "California Dreamin'"
 Ronnie Stone - producer of "Huskisson St."
 Ronni O'Keefe - producer of "Find a Reason"

Other
 Abraham Pants - artwork (1989 release)
 Paul Cox - photography (1989 release)
 Normal Service - art direction, design (1990 release)
 Peter Mountain - photography (1990 release)

Charts

References

1989 debut albums
EMI Records albums
Capitol Records albums
Albums produced by Don Gehman